Beyraq (also known as Peirak and Peyrak) is a village in Khanandabil-e Gharbi Rural District, in the Central District of Khalkhal County, Ardabil Province, Iran. At the 2006 census, its population was 332, in 97 families.

References 

Towns and villages in Khalkhal County